Munir El Haddadi Mohamed (born 1 September 1995), known as  Munir El Haddadi or simply Munir, is a professional footballer who plays as a forward for Spanish club Getafe and the Morocco national team.

Munir began his career in the youth ranks of Atlético Madrid before transferring to Barcelona in 2011, where he won the 2013–14 UEFA Youth League. He made his debut for the B-team in March 2014, and scored in his first match for the senior team in August of that year, at the start of a season in which they won the treble. The following year, he was one of five top scorers in the Copa del Rey, which his team won. He also played in La Liga on loan at Valencia and Alavés, and permanently at Sevilla and Getafe, winning the UEFA Europa League with Sevilla in 2020.

Born in Spain to Moroccan parents, Munir earned one cap for the Spain national team against Macedonia in 2014. He switched his allegiance to Morocco in 2021, following FIFA's change of rules that year, and went on to represent the side at the 2021 Africa Cup of Nations.

Early life
Munir was born in El Escorial, Madrid, and grew up in nearby Galapagar on a street likened to a "Little Morocco" by El Mundo. His Moroccan father, Mohamed El Haddadi Arbrqui, came to Spain in a fishing boat at age 18 and is now a chef. His mother, Saida Mohamed Haddou, hails from the Spanish autonomous city of Melilla on the north coast of Africa; she is a former kitchen hand who now looks after Munir's three siblings. Up to the age of 14, Munir was a fan of Real Madrid.

Club career

Early career
After starting at Galapagar and DAV Santa Ana, Munir scored 32 goals in 29 matches playing for CF Rayo Majadahonda's Cadete A team, on loan from Atlético Madrid, after impressing during a trial in 2010. However, both Atlético and Real Madrid turned down the opportunity to bring him into their ranks. As a result, he attracted interest from a number of sides such as Manchester City, but signed for Barcelona's youth academy the following summer.

Barcelona
Munir made his UEFA Youth League debut with the Juvenil side against Ajax U19, where he scored two goals. He scored braces against Milan U19 and Copenhagen U19, finishing the tournament scoring 11 goals in 10 matches. He scored a brace in the final against Benfica U19. On 3 March 2014, he extended his Barça contract until June 2017.

After being an unused substitute against Tenerife and Deportivo de La Coruña, Munir made his professional debut for Barcelona B on 2 March 2014 in a 1–2 away win against Mallorca in the second division, coming as a 72nd-minute substitute for Sandro. He scored his first goal as a senior player in a 2–1 home win against Girona on 19 April.

On 24 August 2014, Munir made his official debut for the first team in La Liga, against Elche at Camp Nou. He started the match and scored the second goal of an eventual 3–0 win before being substituted after 67 minutes for Pedro. Eight days short of his 19th birthday, he became Barcelona's third-youngest goalscorer after Bojan and Lionel Messi. Munir was a nominee for the 2014 Golden Boy Award.

On 22 February 2015, Munir was sent off for two bookings in Barcelona B's 0–1 defeat at Llagostera, as the season ended with relegation to Segunda División B. He played three matches apiece in Barcelona's successful runs in the Copa del Rey and UEFA Champions League, but was not included in the matchday squads for either final.

Munir was an unused substitute for their 5–4 win over Sevilla in the 2015 UEFA Super Cup on 11 August. On 2 December, he scored his first Barcelona goals since his debut, scoring two in a 6–1 win over Villanovense as Barcelona advanced by the same score on aggregate in the domestic cup. On 17 December, starting due to Messi and Neymar's injuries in the semi-finals of the year's FIFA Club World Cup in Yokohama, Munir won a penalty kick when fouled by Guangzhou Evergrande Taobao's Huang Bowen, from which Luis Suárez finished his hat-trick to send Barcelona into the final, 3–0. The South American duo returned for the final, which Barcelona won 3–0 against River Plate with Munir unused.

On 13 January 2016, profiting from Suárez's suspension, Munir scored both goals in a cup win at city rivals Espanyol, putting Barcelona into the quarter-finals 6–1 on aggregate. He was unused for the final, a 2–0 extra-time win over Sevilla on 22 May, but with five goals was one of as many players to finish as the tournament's top scorer, among them Messi and Suárez.

On 14 August 2016, Munir came on as substitute on the 76th-minute and scored to double Barcelona's lead over Sevilla in the 2016 Supercopa de España first leg to give Barcelona a lead of two goals in the second leg.

Loan to Valencia
On 30 August 2016, Munir moved to fellow La Liga club Valencia on a season-long loan. He was handed the number 9 previously worn by Paco Alcácer, who had moved in the opposite direction. Munir made his debut on 11 September, replacing Santi Mina after 63 minutes of a home game against Real Betis, and his rebounded header was scored by Ezequiel Garay in a 2–3 defeat. On 22 October, he scored his first goal for Los Che, coming on at half-time for Martín Montoya and equalising at the Mestalla against his parent club in a loss by the same score.

Loan to Alavés
On 1 September 2017, Munir joined Deportivo Alavés on a season-long loan deal. He made his debut nine days later in a 1–0 loss at Celta de Vigo, replacing Enzo for the final 33 minutes. On 30 September he scored his first goal for the Basques, opening a 2–1 win at UD Levante. In the reverse fixture the following 1 March, he was sent off for diving in a 1–0 win at the Mendizorrotza Stadium.

Sevilla
Munir was offered the chance to renew his contract with Barcelona before its expiration in the summer, but refused to do so. Barcelona assured him that he would not play for the club again and has been favored to be sold by Coach Ernesto Valverde, saying "it would be for the best". Several clubs from England and Italy were interested in the forward, but, in January 2019, Sevilla was able to claim him for a fee of around €1 million. The transfer was able to be completed before the transfer windows closed in January, rather than during the summer.

On 13 January, Munir made his Sevilla debut in a 2–0 loss at Athletic Bilbao, replacing Roque Mesa for the final 12 minutes. He scored his first goals in March, one in each leg of a Europa League last-16 tie against SK Slavia Prague, who nonetheless won 6–5 on aggregate, and finished the league season with five goals in 16 games including in a 2–0 win against Athletic on the final day to qualify for the continental tournament again.

Munir scored a hat-trick on 7 November 2019 in a 5–2 Europa League group win at F91 Dudelange, which put his team through to the last 32 and bought his tally in the competition to five.

On 24 November 2020, Munir scored his first Champions League goal in a 2–1 away win over Krasnodar in the 2020–21 season, that goal came in the stoppage time to grant his team a place in the knockout stages.

Getafe
On 31 August 2022, Munir moved to fellow top tier side Getafe.

International career

Spain
Munir was born and raised in Spain, the son of a Moroccan father, and was eligible to represent either nation internationally. It was rumoured Qatar had offered Munir a financial deal to take that country's nationality and represent the nation, which was set to host the 2022 FIFA World Cup.

On 29 August 2014, Munir was called up for the first time as one of 21 players for Albert Celades' Spain under-21 team to face Hungary and Austria in September. However, after an injury to Diego Costa, Vicente del Bosque called Munir up to the senior squad for the first time ahead of a  UEFA Euro 2016 qualifier against Macedonia on 8 September. He made his debut in that match, replacing Koke for the final 13 minutes of a 5–1 victory at the Estadi Ciutat de València. He said after the match he never considered playing for Morocco.

Request to change teams
In June 2017, it was reported Munir and the Royal Moroccan Football Federation (FRMF) had contacted FIFA to change his allegiance to Morocco. However, a FIFA spokesman denied any contact and said the player was ineligible for a switch. On Munir and the FRMF's request, the Court of Arbitration for Sport began debating FIFA's rules on switching allegiances in April 2018. His appeal to represent Morocco was denied on 14 May.

On 1 October 2020, following a rule change by FIFA that allowed a player to change their national team provided they had made three or fewer appearances in qualifiers before the age of 21, Munir once again attempted to switch from Spain to Morocco and was called up to their national team. Nevertheless, this switch was also rejected by FIFA, on the grounds that Munir had played for the Spain U21 team in September 2016, after turning 21. On 28 January 2021, FIFA published the eligibility requirements for national teams, and Munir received the green light to represent Morocco, as he played once for Spain before he turned 21.

Morocco
Munir made his debut for Morocco on 26 March 2021, playing the full 90 minutes as the team drew 0–0 away to neighbouring Mauritania to qualify for the 2021 Africa Cup of Nations. Four days later at the Prince Moulay Abdellah Stadium, he scored the only goal of the game against Burundi.

Munir was called up for the final tournament, held in January 2022 in Cameroon. After two substitute appearances, he started in the quarter-finals, a 2–1 extra-time loss to Egypt.

Style of play
As a child, Munir idolised Messi and Moroccan international Adel Taarabt. A report from FourFourTwo magazine noted his composure on the ball, tricks, speed and highlighted his finishing ability and set-pieces; his ability with his weaker right foot was criticised.

After his goalscoring debut,  Barcelona manager Luis Enrique praised Munir as a player whose effort in training matches that on the pitch, but warned against getting carried away with his performance.

Career statistics

Club

International

Scores and results list Morocco's goal tally first.

Honours

Barcelona Youth

 UEFA Youth League: 2013–14

Barcelona
 La Liga: 2014–15, 2015–16
 Copa del Rey: 2014–15, 2015–16
 Supercopa de España: 2016, 2018
 UEFA Champions League: 2014–15
 UEFA Super Cup: 2015
 FIFA Club World Cup: 2015

Sevilla
 UEFA Europa League: 2019–20

Individual
 UEFA Youth League top scorer: 2013–14
 UEFA Youth League top assists: 2013–14
 Copa del Rey top scorer: 2015–16
 UEFA Europa League Squad of the Season: 2019–20

See also
 List of association footballers who have been capped for two senior national teams

References

External links

 Getafe CF official profile
 
 
 
 Munir El Haddadi at Topforward

1995 births
Living people
People from San Lorenzo de El Escorial
Citizens of Morocco through descent
Moroccan footballers
Morocco international footballers
Spanish footballers
Spain international footballers
Spain youth international footballers
Spain under-21 international footballers
Spanish sportspeople of Moroccan descent
Spanish Muslims
Footballers from the Community of Madrid
Association football forwards
Segunda División players
La Liga players
FC Barcelona players
FC Barcelona Atlètic players
Valencia CF players
Deportivo Alavés players
Sevilla FC players
Getafe CF footballers
2021 Africa Cup of Nations players
UEFA Champions League winning players
UEFA Europa League winning players
Dual internationalists (football)